The 1938 Princeton Tigers football team was an American football team that represented Princeton University as an independent during the 1938 college football season. In its first season under head coach Tad Wieman, the team compiled a 3–4–1 record and outscored opponents by a total of 117 to 107. The team played its home games at Palmer Stadium in Princeton, New Jersey.

Tom Mountain was the team captain. He also received the John Prentiss Poe Cup, the team's highest award.

On February 9, 1938, Fritz Crisler announced his resignation as Princeton's head football coach in order to assume the same position at Michigan. Tad Wieman, who had served as an assistant coach under Crisler, was named days later as the school's new head coach.

Schedule

References

Princeton
Princeton Tigers football seasons
Princeton Tigers football